Scope is an Australian children science program. It premiered on Network 10 on 19 September 2005. The series aired on 10 Peach from 2013 to 2020.

On 3 February 2021, 10 announced that they had cancelled the show after 15 years.

Presenters
 Dr Rob Bell (September 2005 – 13 August 2016)
 Lee Constable (20 August 2016 – 19 April 2020)
 Isla Nakano (17 May 2020 – 20 September 2020)

Broadcast history
 The show premiered on 19 September 2005, Monday at 4pm.
 From 2005 until 2008, the show aired on Thursdays at 4pm.
 On 6 January 2009 – 30 December 2009, it aired Thursdays at 7.30am, Saturdays at 9am, and on Sundays at 7am.
 On 4 January 2010 – 22 February 2012, it aired Thursdays at 8am, and on Sundays at 7am.
 On 23 February 2012 – 31 October 2013, it aired on Thursdays at 4pm and on Saturdays at 9am.
 On 7 November 2013 – 2016, it aired on Thursdays at 8am on Eleven (now 10 Peach) due to launch of Wake Up and Studio 10, with repeats on Saturdays at 8am.
 In 2016 – 8 April 2018, it aired on Saturdays at 8.30am, with repeats on Thursdays at 8am.
 On 8 April 2018 – 20 September 2020, it moved to Sundays at 10 am, while repeats stayed on Thursdays at 8am.

Series overview

Series 5

See also
 Totally Wild
 Toasted TV
 Gamify (TV series)
 Crocamole
 Puzzle Play
 Wurrawhy
 In the Box

 List of Australian television series

References

External links
 Official Website
 

Australian children's television series
Network 10 original programming
10 Peach original programming
2000s Australian television series
2010s Australian television series
2005 Australian television series debuts
2020 Australian television series endings
Television shows set in Queensland
Television shows set in Brisbane
English-language television shows